Palestinian Baháʼís are Palestinians who practise the Baháʼí Faith. The Palestinian Baháʼís constitute one of the earliest Baháʼí Faith practitioners due to the fact that two of the holiest Baháʼí cities, Haifa and Acre, are located in places where Palestinians previously constituted a significant proportion of the population prior to the 1948 Palestinian exodus. The contemporary ban on seeking proselytizing to Israelis was originally conceived of as a ban on proselytizing to Palestinians. During the Mandatory Palestine period, Palestinians Baháʼís were one of eight categories as options on the censuses carried out by the former British protectorate.

According to Naim Ateek, in the modern era, there are Palestinian Baháʼís who live alongside Palestinians of other religious persuasions. Author Alan Bryson has reported the existence of Palestinian Baháʼís in the West Bank. On occasion, there are Palestinian Baháʼís who were raised in another Abrahamic religion, but thereafter converted to the Baháʼí Faith.

Notable Palestinian Baháʼís
Maliheh Afnan
Suheil Bushrui
Munírih
Leila Shahid

See also
Bani Hamida

References